Shuiji is a town of Jianyang District, Nanping, in northern Fujian province, China.

See also
List of township-level divisions of Fujian
Wuyi New Area

References

Township-level divisions of Fujian